Robert P. Duckworth (born in Philadelphia, Pennsylvania) is a Maryland Republican politician who has resided in Crofton, Maryland since 1968.  Duckworth served as elected Clerk of the Circuit Court for Anne Arundel County, Maryland, from 1994 to 2018 and is the 42nd Clerk of the Court since 1650.

Duckworth is the constitutionally responsible custodian of the court records for Anne Arundel County's Circuit Court.  He has served as President of the Maryland Circuit Court Clerks Association and was the first Chairman of the Chief Judge's Conference of Circuit Court Clerks. He has played a major role in modernizing Maryland's land records operations into an electronic format and in developing a professional development program for Clerk employees across the state. He serves as the legislative liaison between the Clerks and the Maryland General Assembly.

As Clerk, he is not only the keeper of the court records, but he also swears in commissions, records deed and assumes a variety of administrative court functions; he has performed thousands of marriages since holding office, including a Governor and State and locally elected officials.

Duckworth ran for Congress in 1990, 1992 and 2004.  Before the 2004 election he filed suit in federal court to overturn Maryland's congressional redistricting plan. This "gerrymandered" plan divided the county into four other congressional districts, leaving the county without one strong congressional vote.  

In 2006, Duckworth was vocally opposed to same-sex marriage. At the time the state of Maryland defined marriage in statute law as valid only between a man and a woman. He testified before the Senate and House Judiciary Committees supporting passage of an amendment that would make this definition part of the Maryland Constitution.

Before running for political office, Duckworth briefly worked on Capitol Hill, following his many years as a senior policy staffer at the Department of Housing and Urban Development under the Reagan Administration. A political science graduate of Catholic University and a former 82nd Airborne Division medic, he is married with two children and three grandchildren.

Sources
 Federal Election Commission Campaign Finance Reports and Data
 Maryland State Board of Elections Campaign Finance Database
 Duckworth v. State Board of Elections et al.

External links
Duckworth biography, from the Maryland Archives
Clerk of the Circuit Court Site

Catholic University of America alumni
People from Crofton, Maryland
Year of birth missing (living people)
Living people
Politicians from Philadelphia
Maryland Republicans